The 2010 Men's Ice Hockey World Championships was the 74th such event hosted by the International Ice Hockey Federation. Teams representing 48 countries participated in four levels of competition. The competition also served as qualifications for division placements in the 2011 competition.

The 2010 IIHF World Championship was held in Germany between 7 May and 23 May 2010 with events being held in Gelsenkirchen, Mannheim and Cologne.

Championship 

The Championship took place between sixteen teams from 7 to 23 May 2010. Germany hosted the event with games being played in Gelsenkirchen, Mannheim and Cologne.

Championship – Final Standings

Division I 

Division I was held from 17 to 25 April 2010. Participants in this tournament were separated into two separate tournament groups. The Group A tournament was contested in Tilburg, Netherlands. Group B's games were played in Ljubljana, Slovenia.

Group A
 — promoted to Championship pool for 2011

 — relegated to Division II for 2011

Group B
 — promoted to Championship pool for 2011

 — relegated to Division II for 2011

Division II 

Division II was held 10 to 17 April 2010. Participants in this tournament were separated into two separate tournament groups. The Group A tournament was held in Mexico City, Mexico. Group B's games were played in Narva, Estonia.

Group A
 — promoted to Division I for 2011

 — relegated to Division III for 2011

Group B
 — promoted to Division I for 2011

 — relegated to Division III for 2011

Division III 

Division III was held 14 to 18 April 2010. Participants in this tournament were separated into two separate tournament groups. The Group A tournament was held in Kockelscheuer, Luxembourg. Group B's games were played in Yerevan, Armenia.

Group A
 — promoted to Division II for 2011

Group B
 — promoted to Division II for 2011

  — disqualified

References

External links 
 International Ice Hockey Federation

2010
 
2010 in ice hockey
2010